Leucoptera parinaricola is a moth in the family Lyonetiidae that is endemic to South Africa.

The larvae feed on Parinari capensis.

References

Leucoptera (moth)
Moths described in 1955
Endemic moths of South Africa